The 2015 USAC Traxxas Silver Crown Champ Car Series season was the 44th season of the USAC Silver Crown Series. The series began with the Hemelgarn Racing/Super Fitness Rollie Beale Classic at the Toledo Speedway on May 1, and ended on October 10 at New York State Fairgrounds. Kody Swanson began the season as the defending champion and retained his title.

Schedule/Results

References

USAC Silver Crown Series
United States Auto Club